The  flows through Kumamoto, Ōita, Fukuoka and Saga prefectures in Japan. It flows from Mount Aso and empties into the Ariake Sea. It is also nicknamed "Chikushijirō". 

The river is also important to industry, with twenty electrical power plants located along its banks, as well as the major city of Kurume in Fukuoka Prefecture. Recognizing the requirement to satisfy divergent needs of various communities along the river, the Japanese Ministry of Land, Infrastructure, Transport and Tourism designated the Chikugo River (along with six other river systems in Japan) as a "Water Resources Development River System" with a comprehensive utilization plan to develop the river's resources.

The Chikugogawa Onsen Fireworks, held annually on July 28, are the largest fireworks display in Kyūshū. The event has been held since 1650 on the riverbanks at Kurume.

See also 
Chikugo River Lift Bridge

References 
 de Graaf, Rutger. Urban Water in Japan. CRC Press (2008). 
Japan Water Agency map
Chikugogawa Onsen Fireworks

Notes

Rivers of Fukuoka Prefecture
Rivers of Kumamoto Prefecture
Rivers of Ōita Prefecture
Rivers of Saga Prefecture
Kyushu region
Rivers of Japan